Amberley railway station is a railway station in West Sussex, England. It serves the village of Amberley, about half a mile away, and was opened by the London, Brighton and South Coast Railway. The Amberley Working Museum – a museum of industry – is accessed from the former station goods yard.

It is  down the line from  via  on the Arun Valley Line.

History
Opened by the London, Brighton and South Coast Railway on 3 August 1863, it became part of the Southern Railway during the Grouping of 1923. 

The station had two platforms connected with a footbridge, a signalbox (now closed) is situated on Platform 2, under the station canopy. There was a goods yard with connections into a "chalk and lime works" to the south of the station and "Amberley Lime Works", now the Amberley Working Museum to the north east. The goods yard was equipped to take most sorts of goods including live stock and had a 1 ton crane.

The station was host to a Southern Railway camping coach from 1938 to 1939.

The station then passed on to the
Southern Region of British Railways on nationalisation in 1948. Two camping coaches were positioned here by the Southern Region from 1954 to 1961, the coaches were replaced by two Pullman camping coaches which stayed until 1967.

When Sectorisation was introduced in the 1980s, the station was served by Network SouthEast until the Privatisation of British Railways.

Services

All services at Amberley are operated by Southern using  EMUs.

The typical off-peak service in trains per hour is:
 1 tph to  via 
 1 tph to 

References

Bibliography

Further reading

External links 

 Station on navigable O.S. map
 Picture of Amberley Signal Box situated on the station
 

Railway stations in West Sussex
DfT Category F2 stations
Former London, Brighton and South Coast Railway stations
Railway stations in Great Britain opened in 1863
Railway stations served by Govia Thameslink Railway